Recoil is the third album released by American rock band Nonpoint. It was their only release through Lava Records.

The album debuted No. 115 on the Billboard 200 charts.

Track listing

Notes
 The album also contains 14 tracks if you count the acoustic version of "Past It All" at the end of track 13.
 Track 5, "Rabia", translates to "Rage", is sung entirely in Spanish, but the lyrics in the disc's booklet are printed in English. 
 Track 7, "In the Air Tonight", is a cover of the Phil Collins hit song and was featured in the 2006 film Miami Vice.
 Track 13, "Reward", is 4:00 in length, "Past It All", is 3:39 in length. "Past It All" begins 9:54 into track 13.  954 is the telephone area code of Ft. Lauderdale, FL - Nonpoint's hometown.

References

Nonpoint albums
2004 albums
Lava Records albums